"Nepenthaceae" is a monograph by John Muirhead Macfarlane on the tropical pitcher plants of the genus Nepenthes. It was published in 1908 in Adolf Engler's Das Pflanzenreich. It was the most exhaustive revision of the genus up to that point, covering all known species, and included detailed accounts of the structure, anatomy, and development of Nepenthes.

Content
Macfarlane recognised 58 species, including 8 newly described ones: N. anamensis (later synonymised with N. smilesii), N. beccariana, N. copelandii, N. deaniana, N. hemsleyana, N. neglecta (possibly the natural hybrid between N. gracilis and N. mirabilis), N. philippinensis, and N. tubulosa (later synonymised with N. mirabilis). Macfarlane also described a number of new varieties, including N. alata var. biflora (later synonymised with N. negros), N. alata var. ecristata (later synonymised with N. kurata), N. albomarginata var. rubra, N. hirsuta var. glabrata, N. hirsuta var. typica, N. tentaculata var. tomentosa, and N. vieillardii var. montrouzieri. The varietal name N. gracilis var. arenaria, originating from a herbarium sheet, also appeared in print for the first time in Macfarlane's monograph. The work included all manmade hybrids known at the time.

Macfarlane synonymised a number of species, including N. korthalsiana with N. gracilis, N. macrostachya with N. mirabilis, N. sumatrana with N. treubiana (later reversed), and both N. teysmanniana and N. tomentella with N. albomarginata. Macfarlane restored N. edwardsiana as a species distinct from N. villosa. This decision was reversed by B. H. Danser in his 1928 work, "The Nepenthaceae of the Netherlands Indies", but is universally accepted today.

Macfarlane recognised N. × cincta as a natural hybrid between N. albomarginata and N. northiana, and N. × harryana as a natural hybrid between N. edwardsiana and N. villosa.

Species
The following 58 taxa are enumerated and detailed in Macfarlane's "Nepenthaceae". Varieties recognised by Macfarlane are also included. Taxon names are listed as they appear in the monograph, including orthographic variants, though specific epithets derived from proper nouns have been decapitalised.

 N. alata
var. biflora
var. ecristata
 N. albo-lineata
 N. albo-marginata
var. rubra
var. villosa
 N. alicae
 N. ampullaria
var. geelvinkiana
var. longicarpa
 N. anamensis
 N. angustifolia
 N. armbrustae
 N. beccariana
 N. bernaysii
 N. bicalcarata
 N. blancoi
 N. bongso
 N. boschiana
 N. burbidgei 
 N. burkei
var. excellens
var. prolifica
 N. cholmondeleyi
 N. copelandii
 N. deaniana
 N. distillatoria
 N. echinostoma
 N. edwardsiana
 N. eustachya
 N. garrawayae
 N. gracilis
 N. hemsleyana
 N. hirsuta
var. glabrata
var. typica
 N. hookeriana
 N. jardinei
 N. kennedyana
 N. khasiana
 N. lowii
 N. macfarlanei
 N. madagascariensis
 N. maxima
 N. melamphora
var. haematamphora
var. tomentella
 N. moorei
 N. neglecta
 N. northiana
 N. pervillei
 N. philippinensis
 N. phyllamphora
 N. rafflesiana
var. minor
var. nigro-purpurea
var. nivea
 N. rajah
 N. reinwardtiana
 N. rowanae
 N. sanguinea
 N. singalana
 N. smilesii
 N. stenophylla
 N. tentaculata
var. imberbis
var. tomentosa
 N. treubiana
 N. trichocarpa
 N. tubulosa
 N. veitchii
 N. ventricosa
 N. vieillardii
var. deplanchei
var. montrouzieri
 N. villosa

Nomina nuda v. incerta
 N. cristata
 N. lindleyana

In addition, Macfarlane lists N. gracillima as a possible synonym of N. albomarginata; the species are numbered 7* and 7, respectively.

Reviews and later works
At the time of its publication, "Nepenthaceae" was praised for its many high quality illustrations (95 images in 19 figures) of both morphological and anatomical features.

Research conducted after World War I quickly rendered Macfarlane's monograph outdated. Much additional herbarium material was accumulated during this time, representing both new species and better specimens of known taxa, which highlighted issues with previous interpretations. The need for a new revision of the genus was satisfied with the publication of B. H. Danser's seminal 1928 monograph, "The Nepenthaceae of the Netherlands Indies". However, Danser's treatment did not encompass the entire range of the genus. It would not be until Matthew Jebb and Martin Cheek's 1997 monograph, "A skeletal revision of Nepenthes (Nepenthaceae)", that the entire genus was once again revised in a single work.

References

Nepenthes literature
1908 documents